"Perfect" is a single by Princess Superstar, released in Germany on July 19, 2005, in the UK on August 29, 2005, in the US and Japan on August 30, 2005, and in Australia on October 10, 2006. It is the only single from her album My Machine with a music video.

Mashup
On 22 January 2007, a mashup made of "Perfect" and Mason's "Exceeder", called Perfect (Exceeder) was released. "Exceeder", an instrumental song, was mixed with the remixed vocals from "Perfect".

Song usage
Miss Kittin used "Perfect (A Capella)" on her mix album A Bugged Out Mix.

Music video
The music video features Princess Superstar in a variety of locations, which includes what looks like a rollerdisco and a 1980s spoof. The "Perfect (Exceeder)" remix music video features Lauren Ridealgh, Casey Batchelor and Lisa Shepley as gymnasts who mime to the lyrics performed by Princess Superstar. Valentina Bodorova appears as a genuine rhythmic gymnast acting as body double.

Track listing
"Perfect" (Album Version / Dirty)
"Perfect" (Michi Lange's Sidekick Remix)
"Perfect" (Mr No & Alexander Technique Mix)
"Perfect" (Michi Lange's Sidekick Dub)
"Perfect" (A Capella)
"Perfect" (E-Thunder Chicas Locas Tribal Mix)

Charts

References

Princess Superstar songs
2005 singles
2005 songs
Songs written by Princess Superstar